Guanhutun is a metro station of Zhengzhou Metro Line 2.

Station layout  
The 2-level underground station has a single island platform. The station concourse is on the B1 level and the B2 level is for the platforms.

Exits

Surrounding area
The station is located in the recent emerging Huayuan Road commercial zone and there are some major malls and department stores in the surrounding area.

Major destinations in the surrounding area of the station include:
 Zhengzhou Zoo
 Henan Agricultural Science Academy
 Guomao 360 Plaza
 Dashang New Mart Department Store (Huayuan Road Store)
 Dennis Department Store (Huayuan Road Store)

References 

Stations of Zhengzhou Metro
Line 2, Zhengzhou Metro
Railway stations in China opened in 2016